The Seram bandicoot (Rhynchomeles prattorum), also known as the Seram Island long-nosed bandicoot, is a member of the order Peramelemorphia that is endemic to the island of Seram in Indonesia. It is the only species in the genus Rhynchomeles.

Description
It was named by Oldfield Thomas for Charles, Felix and Joseph Pratt, the three brothers who collected the specimens. The species was described from a collection of seven specimens, made in 1920 on the Indonesian island of Seram, the only record of its existence. It is classified as an endangered species on the Red List of the IUCN, due to its narrow distribution range and noted as data deficient. Conservation of the species, if extant, is threatened by clearing of lower altitude forests near its type locality. The introduction of pigs, dogs, and other feral animals could cause a decline in population. The collection of the type specimens was made in tropical upper montane forest, in Manusela National Park, with one specimen obtained at an altitude of 1800 metres asl. The surrounding region has not been surveyed for this species, although an occurrence in Buru has been suggested.

Vernacular names
Vernacular names for R. prattorum:
Manusela language: mabaya
Nuaulu language: imanona

References

Peramelemorphs
Endemic fauna of Seram Island
Marsupials of Oceania
Mammals of Indonesia
Endangered animals
Endangered fauna of Oceania
Mammals described in 1920
Taxa named by Oldfield Thomas